Kirsanov is a town in Tambov Oblast, Russia, located on the Vorona River at its confluence with the Pursovka River  east of Tambov. Population:

History
It was founded in the first half of the 17th century as a settlement of Kirsanovo, named after Kirsan Zubakin, the first settler in the area. It was granted town status in 1779. In 1875, a railroad was built through Kirsanov, which connected Tambov and Saratov.

Administrative and municipal status
Within the framework of administrative divisions, Kirsanov serves as the administrative center of Kirsanovsky District, even though it is not a part of it. As an administrative division, it is incorporated separately as the town of oblast significance of Kirsanov—an administrative unit with the status equal to that of the districts. As a municipal division, the town of oblast significance of Kirsanov is incorporated as Kirsanov Urban Okrug.

Military
It is home to Kirsanov air base.

References

Notes

Sources

Cities and towns in Tambov Oblast
Kirsanovsky Uyezd